Genevieve Hamper (September 8, 1888 – February 13, 1971) was an American stage and screen actress.  

Hamper began performing Shakespeare as a teenager. She often appeared in early silent films and on stage with her much older first husband Robert B. Mantell. They headed the Robert Mantell-Genevieve Hamper Shakespearean Repertoire Company, and they had a son, Robert B. Mantell Jr. After Mantell's death, in October 1928 she married actor John Alexander, and she retired from the stage. He died in 1982. 

Hamper worked for the Fox Film Corporation, including portraying Claire in The Green-Eyed Monster (1916).

In 1929, Hamper directed her own Shakespearean company that presented plays in venues including the Metropolitan Theater in Minneapolis. She rehearsed actors at Woodcrest, her country estate in Atlantic Highlands, New Jersey. Her directing approach included reducing or eliminating "the ranting and sonorous mouthing treatment of characters" while still delivering the essence of each play to the audience. She felt that the calmer approach would be favored by audiences that had become accustomed to films.

Hamper died at the Sanger Nursing Home in New York City in 1971, aged 82.

Selected filmography
The Blindness of Devotion (1915)
The Green-Eyed Monster (1916)
A Wife's Sacrifice (1916)
Tangled Lives (1917)
Under the Red Robe (1923)

References

External links

 
 
 

1888 births
1971 deaths
Actresses from Detroit
American stage actresses
American film actresses
20th-century American actresses